Sir Edward Peyton, 2nd Baronet (died April 1657) was an English landowner and politician who sat in the House of Commons at various times between 1621 and 1629. He fought for the Parliamentary cause in the English Civil War.

Biography
Peyton was the eldest son of Sir John Peyton, 1st Baronet of Isleham and his wife Alice Osborne, daughter of Sir Edward Osborne, Lord Mayor of London. He was educated at Bury School.  He was knighted at Whitehall on 18 March 1611. On 16 August 1611, he was admitted to Gray's Inn. He succeeded to the baronetcy and estates on the death of his father in December 1616. He was also owner of Great Bradley, Suffolk. In 1618 he was awarded MA by the University of Cambridge.
 
In 1621, Peyton was elected Member of Parliament for Cambridgeshire. He was High Sheriff of Cambridgeshire and Huntingdonshire  from 1622 to 1623. In 1625 he was re-elected MP for Cambridgeshire and was returned again in 1626. He took an active part in the Civil War on the Parliamentary side, but so impoverished himself that he had to sell Isleham.

Peyton died at Wicken, Cambridgeshire and was buried at St Clement Danes in London.

Family
Peyton married firstly on 24 April 1604, at Streatham, Surrey, Martha Livesey, daughter of Robert Livesey, of Tooting, Surrey. She  died in 1613 and he married secondly on 6 June 1614, at St Bartholomew-the-Less, London, Jane Thimblethorpe, widow of Sir Henry Thimblethorpe, and daughter  of Sir James Calthorpe, of Cockthorpe, Norfolk. He married thirdly on 13 December 1638 at St. James', Clerkenwell, Dorothy Minshaw. His widow married Rev. Edward Lowe, Vicar of Brighthelmstead, Sussex, who survived her. Peyton was succeeded in the baronetcy by his son by his first wife .

References

Year of birth missing
1657 deaths
Baronets in the Baronetage of England
Roundheads
High Sheriffs of Cambridgeshire and Huntingdonshire
Members of Gray's Inn
Alumni of the University of Cambridge
English MPs 1621–1622
English MPs 1624–1625
English MPs 1625
Knights Bachelor
People from Isleham